Sanyashi Raja  was an Indian Bengali television period drama series which aired on Bengali Entertainment Channel Star Jalsha and streams on the digital platform Hotstar. It premiered on 11 September 2017 (replacing the show Potol Kumar Gaanwala; and was telecasted daily. The serial had been produced by Magic Moments Motion Pictures of Saibal Banerjee and Leena Ganguly. The show starred Adrija Roy and Saheb Chatterjee in lead roles, (who were also been shown as couples in Potol Kumar Gaanwala) and veteran actresses like Madhabi Mukherjee and Sabitri Chatterjee in prominent supporting roles.The show ended on 15 July 2018, after airing 306 episodes.

Premise 
Set in the pre-independence era, young Bimboboti marries Raja Ronendro. When he returns after being missing for a long time, Bimboboti struggles to fight the royal enemies while bringing some revolutionary changes in the household.

Cast

Main cast 
 Adrija Addy Roy as Rani Bimboboti Rai (née Sen) aka Bimbo / " Mejo Bourani " - Main Lead, Mejo Kumar's wife.
 Saheb Chatterjee as Rajkumar Ronendro Vardhan Rai  aka " Mejo Kumar " - Titular Lead, Bimboboti's husband.

Recurring 
 Madhabi Mukherjee as Maharani Charubala Devi Rai aka " Ranimaa "
 Sabitri Chatterjee as Rajkumari Rashmoni Devi Bosu (née Rai) aka " Pishimaa "
 Laboni Sarkar as Iraboti Sen - Bimbo and Satinath's mother, Mejo Kumar's mother-in-law.
 Aparajita Adhya as Rajkumari Indubala aka Indu / Indubala Sen (née Rai) - Mejo Kumar's eldest sister, Ranimaa's first child and eldest daughter as well, Shakko's wife.
 Chandan Sen as Shakko Sen - A social activist, Indu's second husband.
 Rahul Chakraborty as Rajkumar Debendro Vardhan Rai aka " Boro Kumar " - Mejo Kumar's elder brother, Ranimaa's second child (after Indu) and eldest son.
 Titas Bhowmik as Rani Kshonoprobha Rai - Boro Kumar's wife and Ranimaa's eldest daughter-in-law.
 Suchismita Chowdhury as Rajkumari Bindubala aka Bindu - Mejo Kumar's elder sister, Ranimaa's third child and second daughter.
 Rajanya Mitra as Rajkumari Surobala aka Suro - Mejo Kumar's younger sister, Ranimaa's fifth child and youngest daughter.
 Arnab Banerjee as Rajkumar Gyanendro Vardhan Rai aka " Chhoto Kumar " - Mejo Kumar's younger brother, Ranimaa's youngest child.
 Rohit Samanta as Daktar (literally the Doctor)
 Suman Banerjee as Satinath Sen - Iraboti's son and Bibmo's elder brother, Mejo Kumar's brother-in-law.
 Ipshita Mukherjee as Roshni Bai - Mejo Kumar's courtesan and former concubine.
 Rajshree Bhowmik as Chameli Bai - Roshni Bai's elder sister and a courtesan.
 Tathagata Mukherjee as Biplobi Surjo Sekhar Sen 
 Debjani Chakroborty as Rupoboti - Bimbo's elder sister (cameo, 2017)
 Sreela Majumder as Bhairabi (cameo, April 2018)

References 

Bengali-language television programming in India
2017 Indian television series debuts
Star Jalsha original programming
2018 Indian television series endings